Diyor Imamkhodjaev (born 22 September 1989 in Tashkent) is an Uzbek football expert, journalist, blogger, football commentator. On 28 May 2020, he became the director-general of the Uzbekistan Professional Football League.

References 

Sports commentators
1989 births
Living people
Uzbekistani journalists